The 1981–82 season was Cardiff City F.C.'s 55th season in the Football League. They competed in the 22-team Division Two, then the second tier of English football, finishing twentieth.

The season saw a two-tier management system at the club with former Wales international Graham Williams as team manager with Richie Morgan, who had been in charge of the team for the last three years, acting as general manager. However the system failed to produce results and, after just eleven league games, the pair were sacked and replaced by Len Ashurst.

Players

 

    

 

Source

League standings

Results by round

Fixtures and results

Second Division

Source

League Cup

FA Cup

Welsh Cup

See also
Cardiff City F.C. seasons

References

Bibliography

Welsh Football Data Archive

1981–82
English football clubs 1981–82 season
Welsh football clubs 1981–82 season